Feng Liming (born 17 September 1986 in Dechang, Sichuan) is a Chinese slalom canoeist who competed at the international level from 2002 to 2010. He was eliminated in the semifinals of the C1 event at the 2008 Summer Olympics in Beijing, finishing in 11th place.

World Cup individual podiums

1 Asia Canoe Slalom Championship counting for World Cup points

References

1986 births
Living people
People from Liangshan
Sportspeople from Sichuan
Olympic canoeists of China
Canoeists at the 2008 Summer Olympics
Chinese male canoeists